The Holy Cross Crusaders women's ice hockey team is a National Collegiate Athletic Association (NCAA) Division I college ice hockey program that represents the College of the Holy Cross. The Crusaders are the newest member of the Hockey East Association (HEA). They play at the Hart Center in Worcester, Massachusetts.

History 
Holy Cross women's ice hockey became a varsity sport in 1999, after ten years as a club sport and two years as semi-varsity team.   They joined the ECAC East conference, which later became the New England Hockey Conference (NEHC).

Jane Ford, former director of telecommunications for Holy Cross, served as head coach for the inaugural season. Then Peter VanBuskirk took over as head coach in the 2000–01 season, after having coached the Holy Cross men's ice hockey team for ten years. He was head coach for the women's team for nineteen years.

Holy Cross finished first in their conference in the 2008–09 season, with a 24-2-1 record, and won the ECAC Open Championship against Sacred Heart by a score of 4-2. They had six post-season titles while playing in the ECAC East/NEHC: 2003, 2009, 2010, 2011, 2015, and 2016.

After two years of discussions with the Hockey East Association, Holy Cross joined the conference for the 2018–19 season. They were the 10th team to join the conference.

Holy Cross earned their first Hockey East win on November 30, 2018, in a 5–3 victory against the powerhouse Northeastern Huskies. Jada Brenon, the team's freshman goalie, made 34 saves in the win, which was played at home at the Hart Center.

In 2019, VanBuskirk retired as head coach. After nineteen seasons with the women's team, he finished with a record of 295-178-35. He was elected as an honorary member of the Holy Cross Athletic Hall of Fame in 2020.

Katie Lachapelle stepped in as head coach in 2019–20, after serving as the associate head coach for two years. Prior to coming to Holy Cross, she had been assistant coach at Boston University for nine seasons. She has also been an assistant coach at Ohio State, Niagara, and Union. Lachapelle graduated from Providence College, where she played for the Friars. She was captain in her senior year and was on the ECAC All Star Team in 1997. In May 2020, Lachapelle was named as the head coach for the United States women's national under-18 ice hockey team.  The IIHF subsequently canceled the 2021 U-18 Women's World Championships that had been scheduled to take place in January 2021.

Meredith Roth joined the coaching staff as associate coach for the Crusaders in 2019, after serving as the head coach for the Green Knights women's ice hockey program at St. Norbert's College, in Division III NCAA ice hockey. Devan Taylor joined the coaching staff as assistant coach in 2020.

In the 2019–2020 season, the Crusaders recorded their first Hockey East series sweep, against the Merrimack Warriors. They finished the season in 9th place, with a 5-23-5 overall record.

The start of the 2020–21 season was delayed due to concerns related to the COVID-19 pandemic.  A modified schedule was released by the Hockey East Association in early November 2020, based on discussions by the Hockey East's Return to Play Task Force. Hockey East women's ice hockey teams, including Holy Cross, are scheduled to play 18 games that will count towards the final league standings. The Crusaders played their first series of the new season against the Maine Black Bears, on home ice, from November 20–21. Holy Cross lost the first match-up by a score of 2-1 but won the second game by a score of 3-2.

The team's co-captains for the 2020–2021 season are Carlie Magier, Antonia Matzuka, and Julia Pelletier.

Season-by-season results

Coaches 

Sources:

Awards and honors

ECAC East Player of the Year
Stacey Hochkins, 2010

ECAC Open Tournament Most Outstanding Player 
Stacey Hochkins, 2010

CCM All American Team 
Stacey Hochkins, 2009–10 East Second Team All-Star

Stacey Hochkins, 2010–11 East Second Team All Star

Stacey Hochkins, 2011–12 East Second Team All Star

NEHC Player of the Year
Kara Violette, 2017 NEHC Player of the Year

NEHC Rookie of the Week 
Julie Matthias, 2015 (Nov 2 & Dec 14)

Sam Girard, 2015 (Nov 9)

Danielle Doherty, 2015 (Nov 23)

Division I

Hockey East
Millie Sirum, 2020-21 Hockey East Pro Ambitions All-Rookie Team

Holy Cross Varsity Club Hall of Fame
The following is a list of people associated with the Holy Cross women's ice hockey program who were elected into the Holy Cross Varsity Club Hall of Fame (induction date in parenthesis).

 Stacey Hotchkins (2019), Forward, all-time leader in goals, assists, points, game-winning goals, power play goals and shorthanded goals.
 Peter Van Buskirk (2020, honorary), Head Coach

Current roster
As of September 11, 2022.

References

External links
Holy Cross Crusaders women's ice hockey

Holy Cross Crusaders women's ice hockey
Student sport
Under-23 sport
Women in sports